Hernando César Molina Araújo (born August 28, 1961 in Valledupar) is a Colombian politician. Son of Hernando Molina Céspedes and Consuelo Araújo, he studied at the Colegio Nacional Loperena in Valledupar and later studied Law in the Antonio Nariño University, but dropped out. He declares himself a self-taught man. Molina was governor of the Colombian Department of Cesar for the period 2004–2007, a term which he did not complete due to his involvement in the Parapolitica scandal. he was called to testify on May 17, 2007 at the Office of the Attorney General of Colombia.

Career 
 Manager of Electrocesar, an energy state-owned company
 Valledupar city councilman
 Municipality of Valledupar Finance Secretary 
 Colombian consul in Guatemala, Costa Rica, and Panama
 Temporary Colombian ambassador to Costa Rica
 Vallenato Legend Festival coordinator
 Elected governor of the Cesar Department

Governorship

In 2003 Molina ran for the Cesar Department governorship without contestants after a highly influential AUC paramilitary leader in the region named Jorge 40 allegedly mounted pressure over the other two candidates to make them renounce their candidacies. These raised questions about Molina and his possible involvement with illegal paramilitary groups.

See also 
Consuelo Araújo
María Consuelo Araújo
Cesar Department

Notes

References

ElHeraldo.com - Hernando Molina Araújo, El hijo de la Provincia.
Un gobernador en la mira, Revista Semana.

1961 births
Living people
Hernando
People from Valledupar
Governors of Cesar Department
Colombian parapolitics scandal